30th U-boat Flotilla ("30. Unterseebootsflottille") of Nazi Germany's Kriegsmarine was formed in October 1942. Six U-boats reached the Black Sea after a transport over land and canals  and operated from the harbours of Constanţa and Feodosiya from 1942 to 1944.

History 

In the First World War, Imperial German submarines had been transported via rail to the Pola Flotilla based in the Adriatic. With Turkey as an ally of the Central Powers, the Imperial German Navy could also access the Black Sea via the Dardanelles and the Bosphorus, where the Constantinople Flotilla was based. In the Second World War, during Operation Barbarossa, the Luftwaffe engaged the Soviet Black Sea Fleet, but at the Romanian Siege of Odessa (1941), the evacuation of the Red Army forces via the sea could not be prevented with the meagre naval forces available. In October 1942, the 30th Flotilla under the command of Kptlt. Helmut Rosenbaum was founded. With Turkey remaining neutral, access via the Bosphorus was not feasible. It was decided that small vessels, torpedo boats and U-boats, should be transported from the German Bight via the Danube to the Black Sea. The predecessor to the modern Rhine–Main–Danube Canal, the 19th century Ludwigskanal, was not suitable, though, so transport via land was necessary.

Six U-boats of the rather small coastal submarine Type IIB, which at the time served as training vessels in the Baltic Sea, were assigned to this flotilla in being. Starting from May 1942, they were partially dismantled in Kiel, to reduce weight and size. Toppled over 90°, and fitted with additional floating devices, the stripped down hulls, weighing 140 tons, were shipped through the Kiel Canal and on the Elbe up to Dresden-Übigau, where they were placed on two 70 ton Culemeyer road transporters hauled by Kaelble tractors. The boats then traveled at an average speed of 5 mph over the Reichsautobahn (modern day A4 and A9) to the slipway in Ingolstadt. Traveling down the Danube, one obstacle was the old Stone Bridge of Regensburg with its arches. Eventually, the submarines arrived in the Romanian port of Galați where they were re-assembled by the Romanians at the Galați shipyard.

The first boat started to operate from the Romanian port of Constanţa in October 1942, the last joined in May 1943. Despite carrying only five torpedoes, the Type II boats were effective in the Black Sea theatre. In total, 26 ships with 45,426 tons were sunk.  was a lucky boat sinking 15 enemy ships with 38,500 tons without suffering casualties amongst her crew.

The Flotilla's history ended in September 1944, when its three last boats , U-20 and U-23 had to be scuttled on 10 and 11 September near the Turkish coast.

Flotilla commanders

References

Literature 
 Gerd Enders: Deutsche U-Boote zum Schwarzen Meer. February 1997, 
 Gerd Enders: Deutsche U-Boote im Schwarzen Meer. 1984;

External links 
 http://www.lexikon-der-wehrmacht.de/Gliederungen/UFlottillen/30-R.htm 
 Hans Michael Kloth: U-Boot auf der Autobahn. In: Spiegel-Online vom 5. February 2008 
 

30
Military units and formations established in 1941
Military units and formations disestablished in 1944
Black Sea naval operations of World War II
Military units and formations of the Kriegsmarine
German–Romania military relations